The Kowhai Valley and Shearwater Stream Important Bird Area comprises a disjunct site in the Seaward Kaikōura Range in the north-east of New Zealand’s South Island, some 15 km inland from the coastal town of Kaikōura.  The site, at an altitude of 1200–1800 m above sea level, has been identified as an Important Bird Area by BirdLife International because it contains the entire breeding population of Hutton's shearwaters; about 100,000 pairs in two colonies.

The larger Kowhai Valley colony, in the headwaters of the Kowhai River in the Uerau Nature Reserve, was only discovered in 1964, over 50 years after the species was first described by Gregory Mathews in 1912.  The smaller, Shearwater Stream colony is on private land at the head of the Puhi Puhi Valley.

References

Kaikōura District
Important Bird Areas of New Zealand
Seabird colonies